The 2014 Dutch Open Grand Prix was the fortieth grand prix gold and grand prix tournament of the 2014 BWF Grand Prix Gold and Grand Prix. The tournament was held in Topsportcentrum, Almere, Netherlands October 7 until October 12, 2014 and had a total purse of $50,000.

Players by nation

Men's singles

Seeds

  Rajiv Ouseph (semi-final)
  Brice Leverdez (third round)
  Dionysius Hayom Rumbaka (quarter-final)
  Eric Pang (second round)
  Dieter Domke (withdrew)
  Osleni Guerrero (withdrew)
  Ng Ka Long (quarter-final)
  Dmytro Zavadsky (second round)
  Andre Kurniawan Tedjono (semi-final)
  Lucas Corvee (first round)
  Tan Chun Seang (third round)
  Joachim Persson (second round)
  Ajay Jayaram (champion)
  Petr Koukal (second round)
  Arvind Bhat (second round)
  Thomas Rouxel (second round)

Finals

Top half

Section 1

Section 2

Section 3

Section 4

Bottom half

Section 5

Section 6

Section 7

Section 8

Women's singles

Seeds

  Zhang Beiwen (champion)
  Kristina Gavnholt (withdrew)
  Karin Schnaase (quarter-final)
  Sashina Vignes Waran (first round)
  Pai Yu-po (final)
  Natalia Perminova (withdrew)
  Maria Febe Kusumastuti (semi-final)
  Stefani Stoeva (first round)

Finals

Top half

Section 1

Section 2

Bottom half

Section 3

Section 4

Men's doubles

Seeds

  Adam Cwalina / Przemyslaw Wacha (withdrew)
  Huang Po-jui / Lu Ching-yao (second round)
  Jacco Arends / Jelle Maas (second round)
  Baptiste Careme / Ronan Labar (champion)
  Selvanus Geh / Kevin Sanjaya Sukamuljo (first round)
  Matijs Dierickx / Freek Golinski (withdrew)
  Max Schwenger / Josche Zurwonne (quarter-final)
  Lucas Corvee / Brice Leverdez (second round)

Finals

Top half

Section 1

Section 2

Bottom half

Section 3

Section 4

Women's doubles

Seeds

  Eefje Muskens / Selena Piek (champion)
  Gabriela Stoeva / Stefani Stoeva (quarter-final)
  Anastasia Chervaykova / Nina Vislova (first round)
  Shendy Puspa Irawati / Vita Marissa (final)
  Samantha Barning / Iris Tabeling (second round)
  Maretha Dea Giovani / Rosyita Eka Putri Sari (quarter-final)
  Heather Olver / Lauren Smith (quarter-final)
  Chan Tsz Ka / Tse Ying Suet (semi-final)

Finals

Top half

Section 1

Section 2

Bottom half

Section 3

Section 4

Mixed doubles

Seeds

  Muhammad Rijal / Vita Marissa (second round)
  Riky Widianto / Richi Puspita Dili (champion)
  Jacco Arends / Selena Piek (first round)
  Chan Yun Lung / Tse Ying Suet (quarter-final)
  Vitalij Durkin / Nina Vislova (semi-final)
  Ronald Alexander / Melati Daeva Oktaviani (quarter-final)
  Jorrit de Ruiter / Samantha Barning (final)
  Evgenij Dremin / Evgenia Dimova (first round)

Finals

Top half

Section 1

Section 2

Bottom half

Section 3

Section 4

References

Dutch Open (badminton)
Open Grand Prix
Dutch Open Grand Prix
Sports competitions in Almere